, better known by the stage name , was a Japanese voice actress affiliated with 81 Produce.

Shimamura died at 3:06pm JST on February 26, 2013, from breast cancer at a Yokohama hospital at the age of 43.

Filmography

Television animation
Genesis Survivor Gaiarth (1992) (unlisted role in episode 3)
Moldiver (1993) (Nastassja)
Nintama Rantaro (1993) (Nintama)
Captain Tsubasa J (1994) (Mamoru Izawa (young)) 
Genocyber (1994) (Ratto)
Macross 7 (1994) (Rex)
Ping-Pong Club (1995) (Sayuri Ichijo, Sachiko Inoue, Miyuki Chiba, Hanadai, Onizuka, Sato, Ishizaka, Kaoru's Mother, Takashi's Mother)
Wedding Peach (1995) (child in episodes 27, 29, and 30; Miss Kihara; Musashino-sensei in episode 2)
Battle Skipper (1995) (Sister)
New Cutie Honey (1995) (Suzie 7: episode 7)
Devil Lady (1998) (Ran Asuka)

Unknown date
Atashin'chi (Ogawa Sensei (second))
Chibi Maruko-chan (Ueda)
Cool Devices (Rui: Operation 4)
Chrome Shelled Regios (Ramis)Detective Conan (Kyoko Takahata)Fancy Lala (Host: episode 5)Kaikan Phrase (fan in episode 43, young Sakuya in episode 41)Kenichi: The Mightiest Disciple (Kyoko Ono)My Sexual Harassment (Annette)The Gigolo - Dochinpira (unnamed role)Yoiko (Mama)

Theatrical animationMacross Plus: Movie Edition (1995) (Additional voices)Crayon Shin-chan: Pursuit of the Balls of Darkness (1997) (Hostess)

Unknown dateCrayon Shin-chan: Arashi wo Yobu Utau Ketsu dake Bakudan! (Airport Announcer)Crayon Shin-chan: Bakuhatsu! Onsen Wakuwaku Daikessen'' (Female Caster)

Links/References
81 Produce
Voice actress Kaoru Shimamura passes away at 43

External links

81 Produce voice actors
1969 births
2013 deaths
Japanese voice actresses
Voice actresses from Yokohama
Deaths from cancer in Japan